Przemkowo may refer to the following places in Poland:

Przemkowo, Masovian Voivodeship (east-central Poland)
Przemkowo, Pomeranian Voivodeship (north Poland)